Bathysciadium xylophagum is a species of sea snail, deep-sea limpet, a marine gastropod mollusk in the family Bathysciadiidae.

Description

Distribution
 Mediterranean Sea
 European waters

References

External links

Bathysciadiidae